The brown-tailed bar-lipped skink or grey-tailed skink (Glaphyromorphus fuscicaudis)  is a species of skink found in Queensland in Australia.

References

Glaphyromorphus
Reptiles described in 1979
Taxa named by Allen Eddy Greer